Rabbi Moshe Meshullam Halevy Horowitz (1832–1894) was a Galician rabbi.

Born in Cracow, he became the rabbi of Murgeni near Bârlad, now in Romania, and later was a preacher in Lemberg, Cracow, and London.

References 
 Ṿunder, Meʼir (1978–2005). מאורי גליציה: אנציקלופדיה לחכמי גליציה Meʼore Galitsyah: entsiḳlopedyah le-ḥakhme Galitsyah / Encyclopedia of Galician Sages (in Hebrew). Vol. 2. Jerusalem: Makhon le-hantsaḥat Yahadut Galitsyah. pp. 282–283. .

External links 
Horowitz's works: Zikhron Moshe and Tiferet le-Moshe at Hebrewbooks.org

1832 births
1894 deaths
British Orthodox rabbis
Polish Hasidic rabbis
Hasidic rabbis in Europe
Romanian Orthodox rabbis
Orthodox rabbis from Galicia (Eastern Europe)
People from Vaslui County